William James Dodd (1862–1930) was an American architect and designer who worked mainly in Louisville, Kentucky from 1886 through the end of 1912 and in Los Angeles, California from early 1913 until his death. Dodd rose from the so-called First Chicago School of architecture, though of greater influence for his mature designs was the classical aesthetic of the Beaux-Arts style ascendant after the Chicago World's Columbian Exposition of 1893. His design work also included functional and decorative architectural glass and ceramics, furniture, home appliances, and literary illustration.

In a prodigious career lasting more than 40 years, Dodd left many extant structures on both east and west coasts and in the midwest and upper south, among the best known of these being the original Presbyterian Seminary campus (now Jefferson Community & Technical College), the Weissinger-Gaulbert Apartments, and the old YMCA building, all three in downtown Louisville. Also notable 
are his numerous residential and ecclesiastical designs still in use in Kentucky and Tennessee.  In California, examples of his extant work include the Pacific Center and Hearst's Los Angeles Herald-Examiner Building in downtown Los Angeles and the San Gabriel Mission Playhouse south of Pasadena. Some of his earliest attributed designs may be found in Hyde Park, Illinois.

Early years

William J. Dodd was born in Quebec City, Canada, in 1862. Prior to emigrating from Canada to the United States and Chicago Illinois, William's English/Scots father, Edward, was an inn keeper and before that a wharfinger, and his Irish mother, Mary Dinning, was a school teacher and dressmaker. In 1869, the family of six, then including daughters Jane (Jenny) and Elizabeth, and sons Edward Jr. and William James, moved to Chicago. The 1870 Chicago Directory gives the first known address for the Dodds on south Des Plaines near the original site of the Old St. Patrick's Church. In 1871, the ill-timed move of the Dodd household to West Harrison Street in Ward 9 placed them in the path of the great Chicago fire in October of the same year.

Dodd received his training in the office studio of Chicago architect William Le Baron Jenney, c. 1878–1879, and his first employment from 1880 into mid 1883 appears to be for the Pullman Car Company as a draftsman of architect Solon Spencer Beman's designs for the planned city of Pullman, Illinois now the Pullman National Monument. Dodd's social life in Pullman was marked with athletic participation on the first Pullman competitive rowing crew. As a member of the Pullman Rowing Club and the Pullman Pleasure Club he was often mentioned in the press accounts of fetes and dance parties that he coordinated for the young elites of Pullman and Hyde Park. This sporting sociability is not merely incidental to Dodd but returns as an important feature of his later life in Louisville, with his membership in the Pendennis Club and Louisville Country Club, and in Los Angeles with his co-founding of The Uplifters Club, an offshoot of the Los Angeles Athletic Club.

In November 1889 William J. Dodd married Ione Estes of Memphis, TN. The marriage produced no children. Ione was from a large family of some political and historical importance in post-Reconstruction era Tennessee and in the Upland South region. It is not yet determined what was the religious practice, if any, of William and Ione after marriage. Ione was Presbyterian, and their marriage was officiated by a Presbyterian minister. William was christened in the Methodist Church.

There are other uncertainties in Dodd's biography. Although naturalized in 1869 upon entering the United States, from the 1890s onward Dodd identifies as Chicago-born, doing so, Jay Gatsby-like, in all kinds of public documents. In an 1897 interview with a reporter for the Louisville Courier-Journal W. J. Dodd left the reporter, and thus posterity, with the impression that he was a native Chicagoan, that he graduated from "the Chicago schools" and had been in the first graduating class of the Chicago Art Institute. The archives of the Institute do not yet support this claim.  Similarly unclear is precisely when Dodd began his professional practice in Louisville.  The year usually offered in the histories of Kentucky architects (from Withey to Hedgepeth, to Kleber, to Luhan, Domer and Mohney)  for Dodd's arrival in Louisville is 1884, based on the forementioned 1897 Courier-Journal article. In contrast, the Chicago Tribune still identifies him with the Pullman Rowing Club
in early 1884, around this time taking employment as an architect with the Northern Pacific Railway upon recommendation by S. S. Beman and moving to the rail company's office in Portland Oregon only to return to Chicago (Hyde Park) and employment with the Beman brothers (S. S. and W. I.) by the end of 1885 after the Northern Pacific's collapse and reorganization. The journal Inland Architect of February 1886 announces Dodd's imminent departure from Chicago to begin a partnership with O. C. Wehle of Louisville, saying: "Mr Dodd will [soon] be a valuable addition to the architects of Louisville". By September 1886 Dodd is cited as partner with Oscar Wehle for the design of "a magnificent three story brown stone residence" in Louisville. In November 1886, Dodd was elected to membership in the Western Association of Architects, his home city being given as Louisville. Dodd first appears as a resident, a boarder, in Louisville in the 1887 Caron's Louisville Directory, and in February of same year, a trade journal cites "Wehle & Dodd, architects, of Louisville." In December 1887, the Courier-Journal newspaper gives the partnership office in Louisville as "s.e. cor. Fifth and Main" 
The American Institute of Architects (A.I.A.) Historical Directory of American Architects has held that Dodd did not join the A.I.A. national organization until 1916 despite Dodd's listing in membership with the Louisville Chapter 
of the A.I.A. in 1912 and in Southern California A.I.A. chapter in 1915.

Career

Dodd spent nearly 27 years in Louisville. During this time his professional partners were Oscar C. Wehle, Mason Maury(1889-1896), Arthur Cobb, and Kenneth McDonald. Also, Dodd's output from these years contained many free-lance projects. He worked throughout Kentucky and across the midwest, specifically Illinois, Indiana, Ohio, and Tennessee, creating structures of exceptional craftsmanship and high style, designs which traced the transitional tastes and technologies of the period before Modernism. On the east coast, extant Dodd structures from the early 1890s can be found in Virginia, in the historic Ghent (Norfolk) neighborhood.

On Christmas Day 1912 Dodd departed the midwest to continue his profession in the greater Los Angeles area, a period lasting until his death there in June 1930. In Los Angeles, Dodd partnered briefly with J. Martyn Haenke (1877–1963) and later with William Richards (1871–1945), his longest professional partnership.
 
In southern California, "the Southland", Dodd's buildings are to be found in the old downtown financial district around Pacific Center, above Hollywood in Laughlin Park and Hancock Park, to the west in Rustic Canyon, Playa Del Rey and Long Beach, southeast to San Gabriel, and possibly northeast in Altadena.  Related to Dodd's Los Angeles work are residences in Oak Glen and Palm Springs, California.

From as early as 1893, and to the end of his life, Dodd was a mentor to talented younger designers who were new to the profession, designers with now well-known names like Lloyd Wright, Thomas Chalmers Vint, and Adrian Wilson, often outsiders without a developed practice and contending with a new client base and fast evolving licensing standards in cities enjoying rapid expansion as was Louisville after the American Civil War and Los Angeles after World War I. The architect Julia Morgan, a mostly free-lance upstate California designer from San Francisco, rare as a female in a male-dominated profession, formed a team with W. J. Dodd and J. M. Haenke as her LA facilitators and design partners for William Randolph Hearst's Los Angeles Herald-Examiner Building, a landmark downtown Los Angeles project completed in 1915.

William Dodd's design work extended to glass and ceramics. His designs of Teco pottery are among the most sought-after and rare of the Arts and Crafts movement products introduced by the famed Gates Potteries near Chicago Illinois. He also designed furniture and art glass windows for many of his best residential and commercial buildings; examples of such work by Dodd are to be seen in the Ferguson Mansion, currently the Filson Historical Society, and the Hoyt Gamble house, both of Louisville.

Civic and cultural involvement
Dodd was an amateur musical and theatrical performer. It is known that he was a singer. He served on the founding boards of the Louisville Symphony Orchestra (1908) and the Louisville Art Association (1909), now Louisville Visual Art, and he was a member of dramatic societies in both Louisville and Los Angeles. From 1916 to 1919 he served on the board of directors of the Los Angeles Symphony Orchestra, this latter organization being the predecessor of the LA Philharmonic, and he was a mover and shaker in the Los Angeles Gamut Club, an exclusively male music fraternity. In 1918, the journal Pacific Coast Musical Review said "It seems Mr. Dodd has the knack of making artists and others do what he wants them to" and nicknamed Dodd "the Mayor of Seventh Street", presumably a reference to the theater and vaudeville district of old Los Angeles. From 1917 until his death he served on the California State Board of Examiners. In early 1930 he joined the newly founded International Desert Conservation League as an advisory board member.

Death
William became acutely ill while traveling abroad with his wife in the spring of 1930, returning home without Ione in early May and dying at Los Angeles on June 14, 1930 in Hollywood Hospital. Cause of death: lymphocytic leukemia with hypostatic pneumonia. The funeral was postponed until June 28, 1930 upon the return of Ione from Europe, his last rites and burial conducted at Forest Lawn Cemetery, Glendale, Little Church of the Flowers.  Obituary notices of June 15, 23, 27 and 28 make no mention of any religious facilitation of Dodd's memorial. For enlarged context on Dodd's religious affiliation, see the "Early Years" section above.

Extant designs

Illinois, Kentucky, Virginia, and Tennessee

Street numbers reflect the year 1909 citywide renumbering of street addresses in advance of the 1910 U.S. Census.
 Washington Irving Beman residence (1885), 5425 S. Blackstone, Hyde Park, Chicago Illinois
 Max Selliger residence (mid 1886), 1022 S. 3rd St. Old Louisville-Limerick Historic District.
 Lewis Witherspoon & Eliza Irwin McKee residence (Autumn 1886), 1224 Harrodsburg Rd. Lawrenceburg, KY
 Louis Seelbach residence (1888). 926 S. 6th St. Old Louisville-Limerick Historic District. 
 Charles Bonnycastle Robinson residence (1889), a.k.a. "Bonnycot". 1111 Bellewood Rd. Anchorage, Kentucky
 Louisville Trust Building (1891) Maury & Dodd, 5th and Market, Louisville, Kentucky. Links to images given below.
 George A. Newman residence (1891), 1123 S. 3rd St. Old Louisville Historic District
 Charles L. Robinson residence (1890–1891), 1334 S. 3rd St. Old Louisville Historic District
 Covenant Presbyterian Church (1891), now Fifth Street Baptist, 1901 W. Jefferson St., Louisville KY
 W. J. Dodd residence (1891–1892: first residence 33 St James Ct) 1467a St. James Court, Old Louisville Historic District
 Paul Cain residence (1891–1892: first residence 35 St James Ct) 1467b St. James Court, Old Louisville Historic District
 Helen Reid/William Whaley residence (1892), 317 Colonial Ave. Ghent (Norfolk) Virginia
 Nelson County Courthouse (1892) Maury & Dodd, Bardstown Historic District
 Sam Stone Bush residence (1893), 230 Kenwood Hill, Louisville KY
 Bernard Flexner residence (1892–1893), 525 W. Ormsby Ave. Old Louisville Historic District
 Jacob A. Flexner residence (1892–1893), 531 W. Omsby Ave. Old Louisville Historic District
 Harry McGoodwin residence (1893), 1504 S. 3rd St.Old Louisville Historic District
 Cornelia Bush residence (1894), 316 Kenwood Hill, Louisville KY
 St. Paul's Episcopal Church (1895) Maury & Dodd, now West End Baptist, 4th & Magnolia, Old Louisville. Links to images given below.
 Dr. G. W. Lewman residence (1896), 1365 S. 3rd. Maury & Dodd. Old Louisville Historic District
 J. W. Brown residence (1896), 1455 S. 4th. Maury & Dodd. Old Louisville Historic District
 William T. Johnston residence (1896), 1457 S. 4th. Old Louisville Historic District
 Arthur Cobb residence (c. 1896-7), 4561 S. 2nd St. Beechmont, Louisville KY
 Shakleford Miller residence (1897), 1454 S. 4th St. Old Louisville Historic District
 Edmund Trabue residence (1897), 1419 St. James Court. Old Louisville Historic District
 Benjamin Straus residence (1897), 1464 S. 3rd St. Old Louisville Historic District
 William Thalheimer residence (1897), 1433 S. 3rd St. Old Louisville Historic District
 Eugene Leander residence (1897), 1384 S. 2nd St. Old Louisville Historic District
 Samuel Grabfelder residence (1897–1899), 1442 S. 3rd St. Old Louisville Historic District
 Joseph G McCulloch residence (1897), 1435 S. 3rd St. Old Louisville Historic District
 John P. Starks residence (1898), 1412 St. James Court Old Louisville Historic District
 Flemish style library addition to Sam Stone Bush residence (1900), 230 Kenwood Hill Rd. Louisville 
 George Franklin Berry Mansion (c. 1900, addition 1912) 700 Louisville Rd., Frankfort KY. Links to images given below.
 Atherton Building (1901), 4th and Muhammad Ali, Louisville, KY
 Four-stall stable and carriage house for S. Grabfelder residence (c. 1901), 1442 S. 3rd St. Old Louisville Historic District
 Eight-stall stable and carriage house for Peter Lee Atherton residence (c. 1902), Glenview Kentucky
 Five-stall stable and carriage house for EH Ferguson residence (c. 1902), Old Louisville Historic District
 Edwin H. Ferguson mansion (1902–1905), now The Filson Historical Society, 3rd & Ormsby, Old Louisville 
 Fourth Avenue Methodist-Episcopal Church (1901–1902), 4th & St. Catherine Sts., Old Louisville Historic District. Links to images given below.
 Jacob L. Smyser residence (1902), 1035 Cherokee Rd. Louisville
 Presbyterian Theological Seminary (c. 1902–1906) now Jefferson Community & Technical College, Broadway, downtown Louisville
 C. Hunter Raine mansion, a.k.a. "Beverly Hall" (c. 1905–1906), Central and Willett, Memphis, TN
 Bishop Thomas Gailor residence, Episcopal Cathedral of St. Mary. 700 Poplar Ave. Memphis, TN
 Western Branch of the Louisville Free Public Library (c. 1905), a Carnegie library: America's first public library dedicated to serve African Americans, 10th & Chestnut. External links to images given below.
 Muhlenberg County Courthouse in Greenville KY (1907). Links to images given below.
 Atherton Building and Mary Anderson Theatre (1907), 610 S. 4th St., Louisville
 Stewarts Building (1907), also known as Stewarts Dry Goods Company, Fourth and Muhammad Ali streets, Louisville
 Seelbach Hotel (1902 Andrews & Dodd; 1907 McDonald & Dodd) at 4th & Muhammad Ali, Louisville.
 1244 & 1246 Ormsby Court (1907, McDonald & Dodd.) Dodd bought the lots. Attributed by style.
 143 Bayly Ave (1910, McDonald & Dodd) Louisville
 William J. Dodd residence (Spring/Summer 1910), 1448 St James Court, Old Louisville Historic District
 Louisville Country Club (1910)
 Walnut Street Theatre (1910), 414 W. Muhammad Ali (formerly Walnut St.), Louisville Links to images given below.
 George Gaulbert Memorial Shelter House, near Big Rock in Cherokee Park (1910)
 Addison R. Smith residence 1425 S. 3rd and Wyble Mapother residence 1429 S. 3rd (both 1910-11), Louisville, KY - McDonald & Dodd  
 Citizens National Life Insurance Building (1910–1911), 100 Park Road, Anchorage, Kentucky
 First Christian Church (1911), now Immanuel Baptist Church, 4th & Breckinridge streets. Links to images given below.
 Charles L. Nelson residence (1911–1912), 2327 Cherokee Pkwy, Louisville, KY
 William R. Belknap residence (1905–1912), a.k.a. "Lincliff", 6100 Longview Lane, Glenview, Kentucky 
 Alfred Brandeis residence (1911–1912), a.k.a. "Ladless Hill", 6501 Longview Lane, Glenview, Kentucky 
 Weissinger-Gaulbert Apartments Annex, Broadway, Louisville (c. 1912) External links to images given below.
 the old YMCA building, Broadway, Louisville (1911–1912). External links to images given below.
 Louis Seelbach mansion (1911–1912) or "Barnard Hall". 715 Alta Vista Rd. Louisville
 Standard Oil of Kentucky Offices, Fifth & Bloom Sts, Louisville (1912 May-Oct). McDonald & Dodd
 T. Hoyt Gamble residence, 119 Ormsby Avenue, Old Louisville Historic District (late 1912)

California

 W. J. Dodd (first) residence (c. 1914–1915) 2010 DeMille Dr. Los Feliz, Los Angeles
 Coulter's department store (1916–1917), 500 W. 7th St. Los Angeles
 Annex to Brockman Bldg. (1916–17) 7th St. & Grand Ave., originally J.J Haggarty's
 Huntsberger-Mennell Bldg. (1917), 412 W. 7th St. Los Angeles
 Henning Bldg. (1917), 518 W. 7th St. Los Angeles
 Ville de Paris department store Bldg. (1917), 420 W. 7th St. Los Angeles 
 H. L. Rivers house (1918), a.k.a. "Los Rios Rancho" Oak Glen, California
 Ponet Company Bldg. (1918–1919) 12th & Hope. Los Angeles
 W. J. Dodd (second) residence (c. 1922) 5226 Linwood, later the Deanna Durbin residence, Los Feliz, Los Angeles
 Hearst's Los Angeles Herald-Examiner Building, downtown Los Angeles, California (c. 1915).  Design team of Morgan, Dodd & Haenke
 Heron Building (1919–1920), originally the State Building, 6th and Olive Sts. Los Angeles
 Brock & Co. Building (1921), 515 W. 7th St. Los Angeles
 Pacific Mutual Life Insurance Building, now PacMutual, 523 W. Sixth St. at Olive Street, Financial District, Los Angeles (with William Richards, 1921)
 Kenneth Preuss residence (1921–1922), 5235 Linwood, Laughlin Park, Los Feliz, Los Angeles
 Uplifters Club House, now the Rustic Canyon Recreation Center, Haldeman Road, Pacific Palisades (1923)
 Good Samaritan Physicians Bldg. (1923), 6th and Lucas. Los Angeles
 Apartment Bldg. (1923) at 3105 W. 6th, now Borden Retail and Apts. Koreatown, Los Angeles
 Pasadena Medical Bldg. (1924) a.k.a. Professional Bldg., 65 N. Madison Ave. Pasadena
 William and Nelia Mead residence (1924), now "The Willows Inn", Tahquitz Canyon Way, Palm Springs, CA
 Roland Bishop residence (1925), now "The Willows Inn", Tahquitz Canyon Way, Palm Springs, CA
 San Gabriel Mission Auditorium, greater Los Angeles. (1926)
 Jacob Riis Vocational School for Boys (1927), renamed as Mary McLeod Bethune Junior High School, on 69th between Broadway and Main
 Residence (1930) 8252 Rees Ave., Playa del Rey Los Angeles
 Ivan Miller residence (1930) 8207 Delgany Ave, Playa del Rey Los Angeles. Intended as his retirement house, this is one of Dodd's final residential designs. Anecdotal accounts by neighbors on Delgany Ave. suggest that the Dodds may have begun to occupy this property at the time of William's death.
 W. J. Dodd (final) residence of record at time of his death (1928–1930) 1975 DeMille Dr. Los Feliz, Los Angeles

Demolished or destroyed Dodd structures [Under construction and review]

Kentucky
 Thompson A. Lyon residence (c. 1893, demolished c. 1970) 4646 Bellevue, Beechmont neighborhood, Louisville
 J. E. Whitney Cottage (1899, demolished in May 1951) 210 E. Gray St., downtown Louisville.
 Masonic Theater (1903, later Strand Theater: demolished 1947) on Chestnut St. between 3rd & 4th Avenues.
 Atherton Building (the first so-named, 1901: demolished 1979) at Fourth and Muhammad Ali Blvd. Louisville
 Frankel Memorial Chapel (collapsed July 2012) The Temple Cemetery, 2716 Preston St. Louisville
 Lincoln Building (later Washington Building, 1906–1907: demolished 1972) at Fourth and Market, Louisville
 Lansdowne, a.k.a. Country estate of S. Thruston Ballard in Glenview, 1907-8: demolished 1976.
 Rio Vista, a.k.a. Country estate of Mr. & Mrs. John H. Caperton, 1909-1910 River Road, Mockingbird Valley, Louisville. Demolished around 1955.

Tennessee
 Albert Sloo Caldwell residence, a.k.a. "Baldaur", 1897. Formerly 216 N. Waldran Ave/Blvd. Memphis. [Demolished: 1966] (A design based upon Dodd's 1893 Kentucky State Building for the Chicago World's Columbian Exposition.)
 Residence of William B. Rogers, M.D., c. 1902. Formerly 1257 Poplar Blvd/St/Ave. Memphis. [Demolished: year unknown]

California
 Jacob "Jake" M. Danziger-Daisy Canfield residence (1914: demolished 1951). Mediterranean Eclectic/Mission Revival style, first residence in Bel Air development. Link to image: "Capo di Monte"
 Kinema [Deluxe Movie] Theater (1916, later Criterion: demolished 1941)642 S. Grand Ave. Los, Angeles 
 Architects' Building (1927: demolished 1968–1969) at Fifth and Figueroa, Los Angeles
 Bank of America/Los Angeles Trust and Savings Bank (1928: demolished 1970s) at Broadway and Brand, Glendale

See also
 Arts and Crafts movement
 Beaux-Arts architecture
 Mediterranean Revival architecture
 Old Louisville

References

External links

 Page where may be found an article on J. Martyn Haenke
 Database: Adrian Wilson - California Architect
  ArchitectsBuilding, Los Angeles: Blog posting by Nathan Marsak. Mar. 14, 2009
 Architech Gallery: Artist - Lloyd Wright Jr.(1890–1972)
 Images of the Louisville Trust Co. building in Louisville KY
 Images of historic churches in Louisville KY including St. Paul's Episcopal,  Fourth Avenue Methodist, and First Christian
 Images of Muhlenberg County Courthouse, Greenville KY
 Image of old YMCA building, now St. Francis High School in Louisville, KY
 Image of Weissinger-Gaulbert Apts. in Louisville KY
 Image of the Western Branch of the Louisville Free Public Library
 Images of Heron Bldg. and Pacific (Mutual Life Insurance Bldg.) Center in downtown Los Angeles
 Dodd structures destroyed: Frankel Chapel in Louisville Jewish Cemetery
 The C. Hunter Raine mansion
 Image of 1975 DeMille Dr. Los Feliz, Los Angeles
 Dodd designed arts and crafts lodge. Oak Glen, CA "Los Rios Rancho.
 Roland Bishop Residence, Palm Springs, CA; Tahquitz Canyon Way, . HSPB application documentation.
 Dodd Playa Del Rey Residence. Delgany Ave. Historic-Cultural Monument Designation documentation.

1862 births
1930 deaths
Architects from Louisville, Kentucky
People from Quebec City
Architects from Chicago
Architects from Los Angeles
Western Association of Architects
Canadian emigrants to the United States
Chicago school architects